Paolo Stringara (born 22 September 1962) is an Italian football coach and a former professional player. He played as a defensive midfielder.

Playing career
Stringara started his career in the youth ranks of Inter Milan, then making his professional debut in 1980 with Siena. In 1986 he joined Bologna, with whom he played in Serie C1, Serie B and Serie A, including captaining the Rossoblu during the 1989–90 season.

He returned at Inter in 1990, being part of the Nerazzurri squad that won the 1990–91 UEFA Cup. He left Inter for Avellino the following season, and then returned to Bologna a year later.

He retired in 1996 after a season as player-manager of amateurs Iperzola.

Coaching career
After working as player-manager of Iperzola, Stringara took over at Serie C2 club Livorno in 1996, guiding them to Serie C1 at his first season in charge.
Following a number of Serie C experiences, he was offered his first Serie B job in 2001 at Pistoiese. In 2005 he had a short-lived experience in charge of Torino, being in charge for a few days before the club went bankrupt and then being refounded by Urbano Cairo.

After more Serie C jobs, the last of which in 2015 at Grosseto, Stringara accepted an offer from friend and former teammate Jürgen Klinsmann to work alongside him in charge of the United States national soccer team.

On 16 November 2021, Stringara returned into management as the new head coach of Serie D amateurs Pro Livorno. He was dismissed on 17 March 2022, leaving Pro Livorno dead last in the league table.

Honours
Inter
 UEFA Cup: 1990–91

References

External links
 Career summary by playerhistory.com

1962 births
Living people
Italian footballers
Serie A players
Serie B players
A.C.N. Siena 1904 players
Bologna F.C. 1909 players
Inter Milan players
U.S. Avellino 1912 players
Italian football managers
Torino F.C. managers
UEFA Cup winning players
Association football midfielders
People from Orbetello
Footballers from Tuscany
Sportspeople from the Province of Grosseto